Yaakov Feitman is a rabbi, speaker and author  who helped build and expand congregations in more than one geographic region and was the founding principal  of three schools.

Feitman was born in 1948 in a Displaced Persons camp to Holocaust survivors.

Professional
He received rabbinical ordination from rabbis Moshe Feinstein and Yitzchak Hutner.

Feitman is a past president of the Young Israel Council of Rabbis, has been a Scholar-in-Residence  all over the world and spoken at OU, Torah Umesorah and Agudah conventions.

Congregation Builder
Presently the rabbi of the "Red Shul", Kehillas Bais Yehuda Tzvi in Cedarhurst, New York, he has held pulpits in Cleveland, Ohio and Teaneck, NJ.

Cleveland, Ohio
In 1983, moved from Brooklyn to become the rabbi of Young Israel of Cleveland, which at the time  had congregations in Cleveland Heights and South Euclid. Feitman divided his time between and duties between the two locations and helped guide these congregants, over a period of years,
through this transition. Later he helped with another transition in what became the Young Israel of Beachwood, located in a Cleveland-suburb.

Those years involved not only religious matters but dealing with extensive problems regarding
land use and
discrimination 
.

Authorship
 The Rogatchover Gaon (biography)
 "The Halachic Process" (recording) 
 "Daas Torah: Tapping the Source of Eternal Wisdom". In: Torah Lives, ed. Nisson Wolpin. Brooklyn, NY: Mesorah Publications, 1995. Pg ix-xxviii. .
 "The invention of religion" pp. 67–68 by Derek R. Peterson & Darren R. Walhof 
 Out of the Iron Furnace (Shengold Publishing), by Rabbi Eliezer Ben-David, translated into English and adapted by Rabbi Yaakov Feitman
 a  Eulogy he wrote for Rabbi Mordechai Gifter for Yated Neeman 
 an article written for Mishpacha regarding the decades since the passing of Rabbi Yitzchok Hutner 
 Blueprints: Torah views of the world and events around us: Mesorah Publications

References

External links 
  (KBYT: Kehillas Bais Yehuda Tzvi, Rabbi: Yaakov Feitman)

American Haredi rabbis
Living people
Year of birth missing (living people)
20th-century American rabbis
21st-century American rabbis